Richard Amardi (born October 16, 1989) is a Canadian professional basketball player who last played for Charilaos Trikoupis of the Greek Basket League. He played college basketball at Weatherford College, Indian Hills Community College, and the University of Oregon. Amardi has also been a member of the senior Canadian national team.

Early life and education
Amardi, who is of Ghanaian descent, was born in Toronto, Ontario, and he was raised in Scarborough, Ontario. He attended Winston Churchill Collegiate Institute (WCCI) in Scarborough, where he played high school basketball.

College career

Weatherford
In the 2010–11 season, Amardi played his first year of college basketball, at Weatherford College, in Weatherford, Texas. He played in 12 games with the Weatherford Coyotes. He averaged 13.4 points, 9.7 rebounds, 1.9 assists, 1.0 steals, and 1.1 blocks per game. Amardi left Weatherford, due to family reasons.

Indian Hills
In the 2012–13 season, Amardi played for the Indian Hills Community College's Warriors in Iowa. He was the team's starter at the power forward position. He averaged 8.6 points and 5.2 rebounds per game.

Oregon
In his senior year, Amardi moved from Iowa, to the surroundings of Eugene, Oregon, where he played NCAA Division I college basketball at the University of Oregon, with the Ducks. He was the team's starting power forward. While playing under the team's head coach Dana Altman, Amardi appeared in all 34 of his team's games. He averaged 6.4 points per game, and ranked second best on the team in rebounding, with an average of 3.9 per game. Amardi was also ranked third on the team in blocked shots, and fifth on the team in steals. 

In his first start of the year, Amardi scored a career-best 16 points, on 7-of-8 shooting from the field, and grabbed 8 rebounds versus Morgan State. One of the best games that he played while he was a member of the Ducks, was an away game against Washington, in which he scored 11 points, racked up a season-high 9 rebounds, and blocked 3 shots.

Professional career
In the 2014–15 season, Amardi started his professional career close to where he grew up, with the National Basketball League of Canada's Brampton A's. He played with the A's for two years. He averaged 15.2 points, 4.6 rebounds and 1.1 assists per game in his rookie season. In the 2015–16 season, he averaged 11.9 points, 4.4 rebounds and 1.5 assists per game.

Amardi then played with the Niagara River Lions, in the 2016–17 season. He averaged 12.8 points and 6.3 rebounds per game with the River Lions. Amardi was named to the NBLC All-Canadian Third Team. For the 2017 season, Amardi joined Raptors 905, but he was waived on December 11, 2017.

On January 30, 2019, he signed with Al Ahli in Libya. On August 7, 2020, Amardi signed with the Greek Basket League club Charilaos Trikoupis. On January 29, 2021, Amardi mutually parted ways with the Greek team. In 12 games with them, he averaged 7.2 points and 4.4 rebounds.

National team career
On August 22, 2017, Amardi was named to the senior Canadian National Team's roster for the 2017 FIBA AmeriCup, which was held in Argentina. He averaged 3.5 points and 1.5 rebounds per game at the tournament.

Personal life
Armadi is the son of Maxwell (aka Max-B) and Elizabeth Amardi. He has four siblings, Edward, Constance, Olivia and Crystal.

References

External links

G-League Profile
FIBA Profile
RealGM.com Profile
ProBallers.com Profile
Eurobasket.com Profile
Greek Basket League Profile 
Greek Basket League Profile 
College Basketball Bio

1989 births
Living people
Basketball players from Toronto
BC Levski Sofia players
BC Yambol players
BK Spišská Nová Ves players
Brampton A's players
Canadian expatriate basketball people in Bulgaria
Canadian expatriate basketball people in Greece
Canadian expatriate basketball people in the United States
Canadian men's basketball players
Centers (basketball)
Indian Hills Warriors basketball players
Moncton Magic players
Niagara River Lions players
Oregon Ducks men's basketball players
Power forwards (basketball)
Raptors 905 players
Windsor Express players